Jules Steichen (7 June 1902 – 4 August 1977) was a Luxembourgian boxer. He competed in the men's middleweight event at the 1924 Summer Olympics.

References

External links
 

1902 births
1977 deaths
Luxembourgian male boxers
Olympic boxers of Luxembourg
Boxers at the 1924 Summer Olympics
Sportspeople from Moselle (department)
Middleweight boxers